The Oberlin News-Tribune is a weekly newspaper in Oberlin, Ohio.

The News-Tribune is a weekly.

Donald J. Pease was the editor and co-publisher.  Pease moved to Oberlin in 1957 after serving in the Army; he had been hired as managing editor of the News-Tribune. Later, he became part owner. The weekly newspaper won over 85 prizes at national and state level, it was named best newspaper best among papers with a circulation  under 2,300 copies multiple times under his leadership. 

Notable journalists who worked for the News-Tribune include Neil Zurcher, who worked at the paper for 7 years starting in 1954.

References

Newspapers published in Ohio
Daily newspapers published in the United States